First Period is an American architecture style in the time period between approximately 1626 and 1725, used by British colonists during the earliest English settlements in United States, particularly in Massachusetts and Virginia and later in other British colonies along the east coast. Among these cities, Essex County in Massachusetts has the highest amount of preserved First Period architecture mimicking British architecture styles.

Typical features

South-facing
Central chimney
Asymmetrical rooftop
Small diamond shaped casement windows
Façade-gabled

Cold weather in winter of 1630 caused mass mortality of colonists. To adapt better with geographical conditions, First Period houses are built facing south to optimize sunlight and heat up the whole house. Moreover, First Period houses are often constructed with a central chimney, distinctive style in that era, this is because it needs to maintain enough space for fireplaces and secure sufficient air is led to the stove to burn clean.

Another characteristic of First Period architecture is asymmetrical rooftop. It is designed to maximize the heat from south and minimize the coldness from the north, also, it has the function of preventing heavy snow accumulation. Besides, windows are casements, paired with strips of iron, and at that time are small due to shortage of glass.

Façade gables are also iconic feature of First Period houses, this French word means "the triangular part of a house's exterior wall that supports a pointed or peaked roof", it provides extra light for the attics through the small casement windows. The earliest example of façade gable house appeared in 1690, named Ross Tavern located in downtown Ipswich, shows characteristics of First Period architectures.

Interior features

Heavy oak frame 
Exposed chamfered summer beams (front room)
L shaped staircases

Inside the houses, walls are furnished with clay and twigs to protect the houses from severe weather condition, and staircases are created an L shape to match the design of a centered chimney. A heavy oak frame and thick beams (about 8 to 12 inches) are used to maintain the house structure, their exposures are main symbols of First Period houses, differentiate its style from Second Period (Georgian style) interior design.

Wooden frames of First Period houses were smoothed by planes whereas timber frames of later colonial architecture styles were roughly adzed and incomplete. The carpenters wisely chose which part of the frames needed to be exposed and flourished (mainly leaving the timber structure in the front rooms exposed to sunshine), this design had last for a hundred years which demonstrated their expertise in architecture was improving.

Floor plans
First Period houses were constructed with less variable floor plans. The most commonly seen one is Single Eell, appeared in Massachusetts Bay around the 1620s, then by the late 1680s, Five-Room Central Chimney with lean-to Plan was introduced, later by the end of the seventeenth century in surrounding colonies, Double Cell, Two-Room Deep, Raised Five Room Centre-Chimney Plan came into sight. A simple First Period house consists of a hall for daily living and master bedrooms on the first floor and two bedrooms for children on the second floor led by a central staircase. This saltbox house design come back again in the 1940s, Colonial Revival architectures implemented First Period concepts which shows the practicability of First Period houses.

Transformation of styles

Houses Built before ca. 1660
First Period architecture could be divided into three periods of time, the earliest immigrants comprise this age category from settlement to the 1660s. Ten existing houses in Massachusetts have been proved that they were built before 1660 based on structural evidences.

Houses Built from 1660–1700
While houses built before 1660 were designed by colonists with no architectural background, houses built from 1660 to 1700 were constructed by experienced carpenters, with heavy timber frame to support the structure and more complex design (Tolles & Tolles, 2004). One iconic characteristic about it is chamfers with massive amount of decorative "stops" to carry the wooden frame (Sheldon & Wilson, 2004).

Houses Built from ca. 1700 to 1725
Houses built after 1700 are less decorative and quarter-round or wide decorative bevels replaced the older, bold version of chamfers, sophisticated design are no longer favored. With growing populace of Georgian architecture style in New England, timber frames had a tendency to be hidden and decorated, instead of being shown to people. The joiners substituted the carpenters as main contributors to interior design.

Inheritance and Innovation
First Period concepts were developed from English post-medieval styles, there are dominant three types of roof structures in New England which adopt architectural characteristics from the west of England, the principal and common rafter system, the principal rafter and purlin system, and the principal rafter system. These roof design systems were maintained to the later eighteenth century along with exposed and decorated timber frames. The main multiple purlins span the principal rafters at the level of the outer face of the rafters, which are placed above the bay posts, and support vertically laid roofing boards. This style had gained prevalence in the seventeenth century, especially in Essex County, where English colonists firstly settled down.

Meanwhile, English settlers innovated the principal rafter system in New England with adjustments to local conditions. In the West of England, thatch rooftops were widely used, so thick collar beams were demanded, but in New England, thatch roofs were superseded by wooden shingles which significantly reduced the weight and hence collar beams disappeared after modernization.

Types of buildings

Homes
New settlers found adequate amount of wood and mud in New England, but few materials to mix them. They decided to design their homes with solid wooden structures and natural resources to acclimatize themselves to the long and cold winter and the short time suitable for agricultural work. Hence, wooden English cottages emerged in large numbers with thick clapboards nailed to the outside.

However, houses in New England are not unified. The Puritans dislodged some people to Rhode Island and Connecticut River valley and later more untrammeled colonists from other part of England. Compared with former architectures erected by the Puritans, their style is more laissez-faire, mixed with individual personality.

Another English architecture style is brought to New England in the First Period is façade gable, its purpose is to direct the rainwater away and introduce light to the attics, which is abandoned in the later Georgian style, an advanced version of First Period styles but more modern, demands highly symmetrical design.

The Williams–Barker House is a heritage house, its foundation finished in 1634 by house owner, John Williams, who was one of the earliest English immigrants in New England. From the outside, it could be seen that the timber frame supports the shape of the house and there is a central chimney to ventilate, few casement windows and a steep roof. Inside of the house, the ceiling is fairly low and wood beams are visible, fireplace is centered to ensure it heat up the house evenly and dining tables are placed surround it, due to its new use as a restaurant.

Public buildings
In colonial British North America, jails are one of the earliest appeared public buildings, they did not serve the role of imprisonment, but a pre-trial accommodation for defendants. In Massachusetts Bay Colony, colonists established regulations that immigrants should not breach the laws in England and then erected houses of correction for penalty. At that time, recognizance is well accepted by colonial judges, so only few amount of criminals went to the jail, the scale is much smaller compared with contemporary jail in United States.

Moreover, the structure is different as well, the culprits live in cages or cabinets. A familial model is adopted in colonial jail system, jailers (and perhaps their family) live in the same building as the culprits. The jails imitates First Period residential places, built in wood structure and tight arranged planks.

The Old Jail established in Barnstable, Massachusetts was used for 130 years since 1690; the maximum capacity of whole jail is 6–8 people. Cells are small and windows are reinforced with rectangle metals, there is one door in the front which is small as well with heavy bar locks, and clapboards are interlocked at the joints with massive amount of nails.

Churches

Christianity was brought to the United States by early English colonists; the oldest First Period church was built in New Mexico in 1629, named San Estevan del Rey Mission Church, is still in use as a museum. And later in Virginia, Maryland and Massachusetts, few churches were constructed by Puritans following English medieval architecture styles in the 17th century.
Unlike Boston, cities like Plymouth and Hingham have not been restored to attract tourism, churches are well-maintained in original medieval architecture styling with centered fireplaces near the staircases.

Old Ship Church is one of the oldest church built by puritans in Hingham, Massachusetts and a well-preserved example of First Period architecture style. It is named after the shape of ceiling, which was inspired by its architects, carpenters from the early arrived English colonists. The wooden timber frame of the church and walls were constructed in 1681, and later in the 1740s, galleries on the side were added.

Destruction
It is not surprising that First Period houses are damaged as time goes by, but it is not noticeable before 1876 as the Centennial at Philadelphia focused on the past glories. Since only a small amount of architecture samples were left after the World War II and the Great Depression, house owners could not afford the fees to restore the buildings, and wartime preoccupation distracted people from heritage preservation.

Another reason that first period houses are hard to preserve is erosion. During the 1930s, one of nine First Period houses collapsed due to decay of construction materials, wooden are easily rotten due to moisture and fungi (microscopic organisms). Apart from these two decades, First Period houses are demolishing at a stable rate, this is because the local historical commission scrutinizes the process of erosion regularly and takes actions immediately after finding endangered architectures.

To summarize, among over two hundred fifty buildings constructed in First Period, about seventy of them were lost, fifteen of them were destroyed by fire, four of them collapsed, for the remaining buildings, fourteen percent of them were demolished for better urban planning, such as road widening or school playgrounds. Only a small portion of First Period houses are maintained till now, actions are urgently needed to protect the heritages.

See also 
 American historic carpentry
 List of the oldest buildings in America
 Saltbox house

References

External links
 Essex National Heritage Area list of first period houses

American architectural styles
Vernacular architecture
Colonial architecture in the United States
History of English colonialism
Architecture in England